Richard Gordon Small (born 22 March 1938) is a New Zealand cricketer. He played in eight first-class matches for Central Districts from 1958 to 1963.

See also
 List of Central Districts representative cricketers

References

External links
 

1938 births
Living people
New Zealand cricketers
Central Districts cricketers
Cricketers from Hastings, New Zealand